Sibley is a city in Osceola County, Iowa, United States. The population was 2,860 at the time of the 2020 census.  It is the county seat of Osceola County. Hawkeye Point, the highest point in the State of Iowa, is also nearby.

History
Sibley had its start in the year 1872 by the construction of the Sioux City & St. Paul Railroad through that territory. It is the oldest town in Osceola County.

Sibley is named after Henry Hastings Sibley, a prominent general during the Dakota War of 1862, who eventually became the first governor of Minnesota. William L. Harding, governor of Iowa from 1917 to 1921, was born in Sibley in 1877.

In March 2018, the city of Sibley lost a lawsuit brought against it by the ACLU. Local resident Josh Harms had criticized local officials for failing to stop the "rancid dog food" smell coming from a local pork blood processing plant, which he believed would dissuade people from moving to the town. The city of Sibley threatened to sue him and instructed him not to speak to the media about the issue. The ACLU successfully argued that this violated Harms' First Amendment rights to free speech. An injunction was granted, preventing Sibley's officials from "directing Harms not to speak with reporters, threatening to bring a lawsuit, or actually bringing a lawsuit against" Harms.

In September 2018, the city of Sibley was featured in an Esquire article by Ryan Lizza on dairy farms in the region that employ undocumented immigrants. Dairy farmers and their workers expressed concern that they might be raided by ICE. Indeed, the fear of such a raid was so acute that "[o]ne dairy farmer said . . . that [Western Iowa Dairy Alliance] members have discussed forming a NATO-like pact that would treat a raid on one dairy as a raid on all of them." Lizza's reporting received national attention and has been discussed in regional and national news outlets such as Mother Jones, The Des Moines Register, The Washington Post, The Daily Beast, Bloomberg, and Salon.

Geography
Sibley is located at  (43.403046, -95.746471).

Climate

Demographics

2010 census
As of the census of 2010, there were 2,798 people, 1,153 households, and 724 families living in the city. The racial makeup of the city was 99.1% White, 0.3% African American, 0.3% Native American, 0.1% Asian, .2% from other races, and 0.7% from two or more races. Hispanic or Latino of any race were .4% of the population.

There were 1,153 households, of which 3.9% had children under the age of 18 living with them, 60.3% were married couples living together, 8.1% had a female householder with no husband present, 3.4% had a male householder with no wife present, and 37.2% were non-families. 33.2% of all households were made up of individuals, and 95.3% had someone living alone who was 65 years of age or older. The average household size was 23.33 and the average family size was 21.98.

The median age in the city was 44.9 years. 19.7% of residents were under the age of 18; 4.1% were between the ages of 20 and 24; 23.2% were from 25 to 44; 25.8% were from 45 to 64; and 24.1% were 65 years of age or older. The gender makeup of the city was 40.2% male and 59.8% female.

2000 census
At the 2000 census, there were 2,796 people, 1,161 households and 743 families living in the city. The racial makeup of the city was 97.68% White, 0.21% African American, 0.32% Native American, 0.32% Asian, 0.02% Pacific Islander, 0.89% from other races, and 0.54% from two or more races. Hispanic or Latino of any race were 2.22% of the population.

There were 1,161 households, of which 28.6% had children under the age of 18 living with them, 54.8% were married couples living together, 7.0% had a female householder with no husband present, and 36.0% were non-families. 33.4% of all households were made up of individuals, and 19.9% had someone living alone who was 65 years of age or older. The average household size was 2.31 and the average family size was 2.95.

23.7% of the population were under the age of 18, 7.2% from 18 to 24, 25.0% from 25 to 44, 20.4% from 45 to 64, and 23.7% who were 65 years of age or older. The median age was 42 years. For every 100 females, there were 83.3 males. For every 100 females age 18 and over, there were 81.5 males.

The median household income was $33,173 and the median family income was $43,882. Males had a median income of $31,403 compared $21,633 for females. The per capita income for the city was $16,845. About 3.6% of families and 4.8% of the population were below the poverty line, including 2.3% of those under age 18 and 6.8% of those age 65 or over.

Education
Sibley-Ocheyedan Community School District serves the community. The district formed on July 1, 1985 as a merger of the Sibley and Ocheyedan school districts.

Transportation

Highways
  Iowa Highway 60 to  Le Mars and Bigelow, Minnesota runs just outside city limits
  Iowa Highway 9 to Sioux Falls, South Dakota and Lansing, Iowa near the Wisconsin border passes about 1.5 miles north of the city

Rail

The Union Pacific Worthington Subdivision passes through Sibley en route from the Minneapolis area to Sioux City.  The line sees about 4 trains per day.  On May 16, 2021, 47 train cars carrying asphalt, hydrochloric acid, and potassium hydroxide derailed and caught fire in Sibley, leading to the evacuation of about 80 people.

Notable people 

Dick Barber, an American long jumper, was born in Sibley and placed fifth in the 1932 Olympics
Robert W. Grow, the commander of the U.S. 6th Armored Division on the Western Front, fighting during the battles of Normandy and the Bulge
William Lloyd Harding (1877–1934) the 22nd governor of Iowa 1917–1921
Jeff Hayenga, actor
Virginia Rich, food columnist and mystery writer
William G. Steiner, is a children's advocate and nationally recognized expert on child abuse and neglect
Devin Nunes, Congressmen from California lived in Sibley when his family purchased a dairy farm in Sibley
Barb Whitehead, golfer; winner of one LPGA Tour event and member of Iowa Golf Hall of Fame
John Wills, member of the Iowa House of Representatives

References

External links

Profile on county website
City-Data Comprehensive Statistical Data and more about Sibley

Cities in Osceola County, Iowa
Cities in Iowa
County seats in Iowa
1872 establishments in Iowa
Populated places established in 1872